Khurshid Ahmed Nadeem is a Pakistani Urdu columnist, TV host, and author. He has been writing columns for different national newspapers like Daily Jang, Daily Express, Duniya News, and others.

Career
Nadeem is a disciple of the religious scholar Javed Ahmed Ghamidi and most of his political analyses and social writings reflect a specific religious worldview. He has served as the editor of the academic journal Fikr-o-Nazar, which is published quarterly by the International Islamic University, Islamabad. He has also presented talk shows on PTV and Geo TV. Currently, he pens a weekly column “Takbeer e Musalsal” for the Urdu daily newspaper Duniya.

Talk shows
 Alif on Geo TV
 Irteqa on PTV

Books
 "Islam Aur Pakistan" (Islam and Pakistan), published by Al-Mawrid, Lahore in 1995 — An analysis of religious and secular politics of Pakistan
 "Islam Ka Tasawwur-e-Jurm-o-Saza" (Islamic Concept of Crime and Punishment), published by the International Institute of Islamic Thought, Islamabad in 1997
 "Ilm ki Islami Tashkeel" (Islamisation of knowledge), published by the Royal Book Company, Karachi
 "Islam, Civil Society and New Global Context" (bilingual), published by the Organisation for Research and Education (ORE), Islamabad in 2005
 "Beesveen Sadi ka Fahm e Islam" (The Understanding of Islam in 20th Century), published by Al-Mawrid, Lahore in 2008
 "Approaching conflicts: Muslim Society’s Perspective" (bilingual), published by the Organisation for Research and Education (ORE), Islamabad in 2010
 "Samaaj, Riasat Aur Mazhab: Mutabaadil Bayania" (Society, State, And Religion: An Alternate Narrative) — a collection of his weekly Urdu columns written during 2016 and 2017

References

External links
 Khurshid Ahmed Nadeem's columns at Duniya News

Living people
Pakistani male journalists
Pakistani columnists
Year of birth missing (living people)